Hishin-e Sofla (also Romanized as Ḩīshīn-e Soflá; also known as Ḩīshīn and Hīshīn) is a village in Rezvan Rural District, Jebalbarez District, Jiroft County, Kerman Province, Iran. At the 2006 census, its population was 364, in 73 families.

References 

Populated places in Jiroft County